The Kukpowruk River is a stream,  long, in the western North Slope Borough of the U.S. state of Alaska. It arises in the De Long Mountains of the western Brooks Range and flows north into Kasegaluk Lagoon of the Chukchi Sea, Arctic Ocean. Arctic Slope Regional Corporation is the major landowner along the river.

The Inuit name for the river probably means "fairly large stream" or "a stream." A late 19th-century variant was "Kook Pow ruk."

See also
List of rivers of Alaska

References

Rivers of North Slope Borough, Alaska
Rivers of Alaska
Drainage basins of the Chukchi Sea